New University or new university may refer to:
 New University (newspaper), a student newspaper at the University of California, Irvine
 New university (more commonly known as Post-1992 University) in the United Kingdom, institutions of higher education given university status in 1992
 New University of Lisbon, Portugal
 New University Television, a student television station at the University of Calgary
 Universités nouvelles in France, eight unaffiliated universities created during the 1990s
 University of Ulster at Coleraine, founded as the New University of Ulster